Cicak is a surname. Notable people with the surname include:

 Katarina Cicak (born 1974), physicist
 Slavko Cicak (born 1969), Swedish chess player
 Želimir Altarac Čičak (1947–2021), Yugoslav-Bosnian rock promoter, poet, songwriter, music critic, and publicist